Bruch's membrane is the innermost layer of the choroid of the eye. It is also called the vitreous lamina or Membrane vitriae, because of its glassy microscopic appearance.
It is 2–4 μm thick.

Layers
Bruch's membrane consists of five layers (from inside to outside):
the basement membrane of the retinal pigment epithelium
the inner collagenous zone
a central band of elastic fibers
the outer collagenous zone
the basement membrane of the choriocapillaris

The retinal pigment epithelium transports metabolic waste from the photoreceptors across Bruch's membrane to the choroid.

Embryology

Bruch's membrane is present by midterm in fetal development as an elastic sheet.

Pathology
Bruch's membrane thickens with age, slowing the transport of metabolites. This may lead to the formation of drusen in age-related macular degeneration. There is also a buildup of deposits (Basal Linear Deposits or BLinD and Basal Lamellar Deposits BLamD) on and within the membrane, primarily consisting of phospholipids.  The accumulation of lipids appears to be greater in the central fundus than in the periphery. This build up seems to fragment the membrane into a lamellar structure more like puff-pastry than a barrier. Inflammatory and neovascular mediators can then invite choroidal vessels to grow into and beyond the fragmented membrane. This neovascular membrane destroys the architecture of the outer retina and leads to sudden loss of central vision – wet age related macular degeneration.

Pseudoxanthoma elasticum, myopia and trauma can also cause defects in Bruch's membrane which may lead to choroidal neovascularization. Alport's Syndrome, a genetic disorder affecting the alpha(IV) collagen chains, can also lead to defects in the Bruch membrane such as 'dot and fleck' retinopathy. Angioid streaks cause calcification, thickening and breaks in Bruch's membrane.

Eponym
Bruch's membrane was named after the German anatomist Karl Wilhelm Ludwig Bruch.

References

External links
 Pictures at National Eye Institute

Human eye anatomy